Blatnik is a surname. Notable people with the surname include:

 Al Blatnik (1923–2011), American football and basketball coach
 Andrej Blatnik (born 1963), Slovene writer
 Gregor Blatnik (born 1972), Slovenian retired international footballer
 John Blatnik (1911–1991), United States Congressman from Minnesota
 Johnny Blatnik (1921–2004), American professional baseball outfielder
 Thais Blatnik (1919–2015), American journalist

See also
 Princess Tatiana of Greece and Denmark (born 1980), born Tatiana Blatnik